The House at 220 Blanca Avenue is a historic home in Tampa, Florida. It is located at 220 Blanca Avenue. On August 3, 1989, it was added to the U.S. National Register of Historic Places.

References and external links
 Hillsborough County listings at National Register of Historic Places

Gallery

Houses in Tampa, Florida
History of Tampa, Florida
Houses on the National Register of Historic Places in Hillsborough County, Florida
Mediterranean Revival architecture of Davis Islands, Tampa, Florida
1927 establishments in Florida